Synodontis macropunctatus is a species of upside-down catfish endemic to Angola where it occurs in the Uamba River and in tributaries of the Luachimo River.  This species grows to a length of  SL.

References

External links 

macropunctatus
Catfish of Africa
Fish of Angola
Endemic fauna of Angola
Fish described in 2008